Terthreutis is a genus of moths belonging to the subfamily Tortricinae of the family Tortricidae.

Species
Terthreutis argentea (Butler, 1886)
Terthreutis bipunctata Bai, 1993
Terthreutis bulligera Meyrick, 1928
Terthreutis chiangmaiana Razowski, 2008
Terthreutis combesae Razowski, 2008
Terthreutis duosticta Wileman & Stringer, 1929
Terthreutis furcata Razowski, 2008
Terthreutis jingae Buchsbaum & M.Y. Chen, 2013
Terthreutis kevini Razowski, 2008
Terthreutis orbicularis Bai, 1993
Terthreutis series Bai, 1993
Terthreutis sphaerocosma Meyrick, 1918
Terthreutis xanthocycla (Meyrick in Caradja & Meyrick, 1938)

See also
List of Tortricidae genera

References

 , 1992: A study on Chinese Terthreutis Meyrick (Lepidoptera: Tortricidae), with description of new species. Acta Entomologica Sinica, 35 (3): 339–345.
 , 2005: World catalogue of insects volume 5 Tortricidae.
 , 2013: A new Terthreutis MEYRICK, 1918 species from Taiwan (Lepidoptera, Tortricidae) Contribution to the moths of Taiwan 51. Entomofauna 34 (26): 349–356.
 , 1918, Exotic Microlepid. 2: 170.
 ,2005 World Catalogue of Insects 5
 , 2008, On two South Asian genera Ceramea Diakonoff and Terthreutis Meyrick (Lepidoptera: Tortricidae) Polish Journal of Entomology 77 (4): 283–299.

External links
tortricidae.com

Archipini
Tortricidae genera